Brett Alexander "Moose" Stephens (born 20 February 1961) is a former Australian rules footballer who played for Fitzroy Football Club in the Victorian and Australian Football Leagues (VFL and AFL) and currently a performance coach for world class athletes, working with pro tennis players, golfers and surfers.

Football career
Stephens was a key position player originally from Croydon, Victoria, and had stints at VFL clubs Essendon and Sydney, Tasmanian Football League (TFL) club North Hobart, and Western Australian Football League's East Perth Football Club before his recruitment by Fitzroy.

Coach David Parkin gave the mature-age recruit Stephens his debut in 1987 at the age of 26, and he rewarded him with consistent performances. In Fitzroy's best and fairest, he finished 2nd on two occasions. He retired in 1993 with 133 games and 54 goals in a solid career.  He represented Australia in International rules against Ireland and captained Victoria against Queensland in State of Origin.

Post-football career
After his retirement, Stephens became a sports coach in both the mental and physical training sectors, fitness coaching Pete Sampras, Mark Philippoussis and his eventual wife, Zimbabwean tennis player Cara Black.

References

External links

1961 births
Living people
East Perth Football Club players
Fitzroy Football Club players
North Hobart Football Club players
Tasmanian State of Origin players
Australian rules footballers from Melbourne
Victorian State of Origin players
Australia international rules football team players
People from Croydon, Victoria
Australian sports coaches